This article shows the rosters of all participating teams at the 2017 Montreux Volley Masters in Switzerland.

Pool A

The following is the Argentine roster in the 2017 Montreux Volley Masters.

Head coach: Guillermo Orduna

The following is the Chinese roster in the 2017 Montreux Volley Masters.

Head coach: An Jiajie

The following is the Dutch roster in the 2017 Montreux Volley Masters.

Head coach: Jamie Morrison

The following is the Swiss roster in the 2017 Montreux Volley Masters.

Head coach: Timo Lippuner

Pool B

The following is the Brazilian roster in the 2017 Montreux Volley Masters.

Head coach: José Roberto Guimarães

The following is the German roster in the 2017 Montreux Volley Masters.

Head coach: Felix Koslowski

The following is the Polish roster in the 2017 Montreux Volley Masters.

Head coach: Jacek Nawrocki

The following is the Thai roster in the 2017 Montreux Volley Masters.

Head coach: Danai Sriwatcharamethakul

References

External links
Official website

2017
Montreux Volley Masters squads
Montreux Volley Masters squads